The  is an interactive VHS console game system released in Japan by Bandai Namco Entertainment in 1988.  Titles released included a wide variety of known franchises, such as Super Mario World,  Dragon Ball Z,  and many more. The system was also released in the U.S. as the See 'n Say Video Phone by Mattel in 1989.

Gameplay 
This system has the shape of a toy phone, and is connected to the TV's audio output jack.
It has four large main buttons numbered 1 to 4, each with a different color (red, blue, green, yellow).

Throughout the video, the viewer receives calls from characters on-screen, and answers questions using the telephone. The phone uses signals from the video (inaudible through the built-in speaker), to interact with the viewer, as such for giving bad or good answers.

Games 

 Harōkiti no tanoshī tabemono Hello Kitty's Fun Food
 Moomin no Sutekina Present
 Soreike! Anpanman: Karada no Naka no Dai Bōken
 Soreike! Anpanman: Yukai nao Tanjōe
 Super Mario World Mario to Yoshi no Bōken Land
 Dragon Ball Z: Gather Together! Goku's World
 Sailor Moon S: Kotaete Moon Call
 ''Q-Taro Channel

See also

View-Master Interactive Vision
Action Max

References

External links 
 Representation of the complete system 

Bandai consoles
Home video game consoles
Fourth-generation video game consoles
Japan-only video game hardware
1980s toys
Products introduced in 1988